Benvolio is a fictional character in William Shakespeare's tragedy Romeo and Juliet. He is Lord Montague's nephew and Romeo's cousin. Benvolio serves as an unsuccessful peacemaker in the play, attempting to prevent violence between the Capulet and Montague families.

Sources
In 1554, Matteo Bandello published the second volume of his Novelle which included his version of Giulietta e Romeo. Bandello emphasises Romeo's initial depression and the feud between the families, and introduces the Nurse and Benvolio. Bandello's story was translated into French by Pierre Boaistuau in 1559 in the second  volume of his Histoires Tragiques. Boaistuau adds much moralizing and sentiment, and the characters indulge in rhetorical outbursts.

Etymology
The name Benvolio means "good-will" or "well-wisher" or "peacemaker" which is a role he fills, to some degree, as a peacemaker and Romeo's cousin. He also wants peace so civil brawls between him and Tybalt can stop but will do anything for his family even if that means war against the Capulets. (For comparison, see the derivation of Malvolio – ill-will – in Twelfth Night.)

Role in the play
Benvolio is Lord Montague's nephew and Romeo's cousin. He is usually portrayed by Shakespeare as a kind and thoughtful person who attempts to look out for his cousin.

Benvolio spends most of Act I attempting to distract his cousin from his infatuation with Rosaline but following the first appearance of Mercutio in I.iv, he and Mercutio become more closely aligned until III.i. In that scene, he drags the fatally wounded Mercutio offstage, before returning to inform Romeo of Mercutio's death and the Prince of the course of Tybalt and Mercutio's deaths. Benvolio then disappears from the play (though, as a Montague, he may implicitly be included in the stage direction in the final scene "Enter Lord Montague and others" and he is sometimes doubled with Balthasar).

Part of Benvolio's role is encouraging Romeo to go to the party, where he falls in love with Juliet.

Performances
A mock-Victorian revisionist version of Romeo and Juliets final scene (with a happy ending, Romeo, Juliet, Mercutio and Paris restored to life and Benvolio revealing that he is Paris's love, Benvolia, in disguise) forms part of the 1980 stage-play The Life and Adventures of Nicholas Nickleby. He also attempts to romance Rosaline in Sharman Macdonald's After Juliet.

In the 2019 British musical & Juliet Benvolio is portrayed by actress Kirstie Skivington.

Portrayals

In 1968 the part of Benvolio was played by Bruce Robinson in Romeo and Juliet.

In the 1996 version of Romeo and Juliet, the actor who played Benvolio was Dash Mihok.

In the 2001 French musical Roméo et Juliette: de la Haine à l'Amour, the role was originated by Grégori Baquet.

In the 2013 version of Romeo and Juliet, the actor who played Benvolio was Kodi Smit-McPhee.

References

Bibliography

External links
Complete listing of all of Benvolio's lines
Benvolio Character Analysis at British Library

Literary characters introduced in 1597
Fictional Italian people in literature
Male Shakespearean characters
Characters in Romeo and Juliet
Fictional nobility
Sidekicks in literature